Karim Diaby Coulibaly (born 25 December 1989) is a French-Ivorian footballer, who currently plays as a striker for Arras. He played professional football in the Corgoň Liga for Košice.

Career
Coulibaly was a youth player for Valenciennes B and played for the reserve team in the fourth and fifth tier of French football for three seasons. He spent the 2010–11 season with Arras.

MFK Košice
In March 2011, Coulibaly signed a professional contract with Košice, making his debut as a second half substitute in the 2–1 victory over Dukla Banská Bystrica on 2 April 2011. His first goal for the club was the only one in the 1–0 win against Žilina on 25 May that year. In February 2014, he was loaned briefly to Karviná.

French amateur football
At the end of his spell in Slovakia, Coulibaly returned to France, spending the 2015–16 and 2016–17 season with Calais in Championnat de France Amateur, before signing for a second time with Arras for the 2017–18 season.

References

External links
 
 

1989 births
Living people
Footballers from Abidjan
Ivorian emigrants to France
Naturalized citizens of France
French footballers
Association football forwards
Valenciennes FC players
FC VSS Košice players
Slovak Super Liga players
MFK Karviná players
Czech National Football League players
Calais RUFC players
Championnat National 2 players
Arras FA players
Expatriate footballers in Slovakia
Expatriate footballers in the Czech Republic
French expatriate sportspeople in Slovakia
French expatriate sportspeople in the Czech Republic